Guelb El Kébir District is a district of Médéa Province, Algeria.

The district is further divided into 3 municipalities:
El Guelbelkebir
Sedraia
Bir Ben Laabed

Districts of Médéa Province